De Brouckère is a rapid transit station located beneath the Place de Brouckère/De Brouckèreplein in central Brussels, Belgium. It consists of both a metro station (serving lines 1 and 5) and a premetro (underground tram) station (serving lines 3 and 4 on the North–South Axis between Brussels-North railway station and Albert premetro station).

The station opened on 17 December 1969, as a premetro station on the tram line between De Brouckère and Schuman, and it also became a heavy metro station in 1976, serving former lines 1A and 1B. Following the reorganisation of the Brussels Metro on 4 April 2009, it is served by lines 1 and 5, which cross Brussels from east to west.

History
De Brouckère station was inaugurated on 17 December 1969 as a premetro station (i.e. a station served by underground tramways), as part of the first underground public transport route in Belgium, which initially stretched from De Brouckère to Schuman. On 20 September 1976, the premetro line was converted into a heavy metro line, which was later split into two distinct lines on 6 October 1982: former lines 1A and 1B, both serving De Brouckère.

Since 4 October 1976, De Brouckère has also been served by the North–South Axis, which is part of the premetro system. Lines 3 and 4 provide most service on that axis. On 4 April 2009, metro operation was restructured so that lines 1 and 5 now serve the station.

Area
The station is named after the Place de Brouckère/De Brouckèreplein, the city square above ground, itself named after the former mayor of the City of Brussels, Charles de Brouckère. The station lies near the famous Hotel Metropole, the UGC De Brouckère cinema, the Royal Theatre of La Monnaie and one end of the Rue Neuve/Nieuwstraat, Belgium's second busiest shopping street. The whole complex is also connected to the underground shopping galleries between the / and the Boulevard Anspach/Anspachlaan.

Station
The premetro station, located under De Brouckère Square, is connected to the metro station by a moving walkway. The metro station is located under the / and was renovated in 2005.

The metro station serving lines 1 and 5 is known to have one of the widest gaps between the metro trains and the platform, as this station is curved to follow the alignment between the neighbouring Central Station and Sainte-Catherine/Sint-Katelijne metro station. For safety reasons, the curved platform edges are equipped with flashing lights to warn passengers of the gap.

In 2004, a mural titled The City Moves in the Palm of My Hand was installed along the station's moving walkway. The mural was created by artist Jan Vanriet and is printed on finished edge panels from PolyVision. The mural is designed to reflect the city's vibrancy and historical background.

References

Notes

External links

Brussels metro stations
Railway stations opened in 1969
City of Brussels